The 1993 CFL season is considered to be the 40th season in modern-day Canadian football, although it is officially the 36th Canadian Football League season.

CFL news in 1993
On February 23, the Sacramento Gold Miners were announced as the CFL's ninth franchise, during the league's annual meetings in Hamilton. The team began play in 1993 at Hornet Stadium in Sacramento, California. They joined the West Division. Sacramento became the first U.S.-based team to play in the CFL, and it was the first expansion team to be admitted into the league since 1954, when the B.C. Lions became a franchise. A potential expansion team to San Antonio, Texas (the San Antonio Riders, formerly of the then-suspended WLAF, to play as the San Antonio Texans) was put on hold for the 1993 season after the team folded instead.

On March 6, The Canadian College Draft was held in Calgary at the Jubilee Auditorium, becoming the first Western Canadian city to host the event since Winnipeg in 1971. Calgary also played host to the Grey Cup game for only the second time in history on Sunday, November 28. In that game, the Edmonton Eskimos defeated the Winnipeg Blue Bombers, 33–23 before a crowd of 50,035.

Records: Dave Ridgway set the CFL record for consecutive field goals made with 28.

Regular season standings

Final regular season standings
Note: GP = Games Played, W = Wins, L = Losses, T = Ties, PF = Points For, PA = Points Against, Pts = Points

Bold text means that they have clinched the playoffs.
Winnipeg gets a first round bye.

Grey Cup playoffs

The Edmonton Eskimos are the 1993 Grey Cup champions, defeating the Winnipeg Blue Bombers 33–23, at Calgary's McMahon Stadium.  The Eskimos' Damon Allen (QB) was named the Grey Cup's Most Valuable Player and Sean Fleming (K/P) was the Grey Cup's Most Valuable Canadian.

Playoff bracket

CFL Leaders
 CFL Passing Leaders
 CFL Rushing Leaders
 CFL Receiving Leaders

1993 CFL All-Stars

Offence
QB – Doug Flutie, Calgary Stampeders
FB – Sean Millington, BC Lions
RB – Mike Richardson, Winnipeg Blue Bombers
SB – Ray Elgaard, Saskatchewan Roughriders
SB – Dave Sapunjis, Calgary Stampeders
WR – David Williams, Winnipeg Blue Bombers
WR – Rod Harris, Sacramento Gold Miners
C – Rod Connop, Edmonton Eskimos
OG – David Black, Winnipeg Blue Bombers
OG – Rob Smith, BC Lions
OT – Bruce Covernton, Calgary Stampeders
OT – Chris Walby, Winnipeg Blue Bombers

Defence
DT – Jearld Baylis, Saskatchewan Roughriders
DT – Harald Hasselbach, Calgary Stampeders
DE – Will Johnson, Calgary Stampeders
DE – Tim Cofield, Hamilton Tiger-Cats
LB – Elfrid Payton, Winnipeg Blue Bombers
LB – Willie Pless, Edmonton Eskimos
LB – John Motton, Hamilton Tiger-Cats
CB – Karl Anthony, Calgary Stampeders
CB – Barry Wilburn, Saskatchewan Roughriders
DB – Don Wilson, Edmonton Eskimos
DB – Darryl Sampson, Winnipeg Blue Bombers
DS – Glen Suitor, Saskatchewan Roughriders

Special teams
P – Bob Cameron, Winnipeg Blue Bombers
K – Dave Ridgway, Saskatchewan Roughriders
ST – Henry "Gizmo" Williams, Edmonton Eskimos

1993 Eastern All-Stars

Offence
QB – Matt Dunigan, Winnipeg Blue Bombers
FB – Chris Johnstone, Winnipeg Blue Bombers
RB – Mike Richardson Winnipeg Blue Bombers
SB – Gerald Wilcox, Winnipeg Blue Bombers
SB – Jock Climie, Ottawa Rough Riders
WR – David Williams, Winnipeg Blue Bombers
WR – Stephen Jones, Ottawa Rough Riders
C – Dave Vankoughnett, Winnipeg Blue Bombers
OG – David Black, Winnipeg Blue Bombers
OG – Denny Chronopoulos, Ottawa Rough Riders
OT – Mike Graybill, Ottawa Rough Riders
OT – Chris Walby, Winnipeg Blue Bombers

Defence
DT – Lloyd Lewis, Winnipeg Blue Bombers
DT – Stan Mikawos, Winnipeg Blue Bombers
DE – John Kropke, Ottawa Rough Riders
DE – Tim Cofield, Hamilton Tiger-Cats
LB – Elfrid Payton, Winnipeg Blue Bombers
LB – Angelo Snipes, Ottawa Rough Riders
LB – John Motton, Hamilton Tiger-Cats
CB – Kim Phillips, Winnipeg Blue Bombers
CB – Donald Smith, Winnipeg Blue Bombers
DB – Bobby Evans, Winnipeg Blue Bombers
DB – Darryl Sampson, Winnipeg Blue Bombers
S – Remi Trudel, Ottawa Rough Riders

Special teams
P – Bob Cameron, Winnipeg Blue Bombers
K – Troy Westwood, Winnipeg Blue Bombers
ST – Michael Clemons, Toronto Argonauts

1993 Western All-Stars

Offence
QB – Doug Flutie, Calgary Stampeders
FB – Sean Millington, BC Lions
RB – Mike Oliphant, Sacramento Gold Miners
SB – Ray Elgaard, Saskatchewan Roughriders
SB – Dave Sapunjis, Calgary Stampeders
WR – Don Narcisse, Saskatchewan Roughriders
WR – Rod Harris, Sacramento Gold Miners
C – Rod Connop, Edmonton Eskimos
OG – Rocco Romano, Calgary Stampeders
OG – Rob Smith, BC Lions
OT – Bruce Covernton, Calgary Stampeders
OT – Jim Mills, BC Lions

Defence
DT – Jearld Baylis, Saskatchewan Roughriders
DT – Harald Hasselbach, Calgary Stampeders
DE – Will Johnson, Calgary Stampeders
DE – Bennie Goods, Edmonton Eskimos
LB – Marvin Pope, Calgary Stampeders
LB – Willie Pless, Edmonton Eskimos
LB – O.J. Brigance, BC Lions
CB – Karl Anthony, Calgary Stampeders
CB – Barry Wilburn, Saskatchewan Roughriders
DB – Don Wilson, Edmonton Eskimos
DB – Glenn Rogers, Edmonton Eskimos
DS – Glen Suitor, Saskatchewan Roughriders

Special teams
P – Glenn Harper, Edmonton Eskimos
K – Dave Ridgway, Saskatchewan Roughriders
ST – Henry "Gizmo" Williams, Edmonton Eskimos

1993 CFL Awards
CFL's Most Outstanding Player Award – Doug Flutie (QB), Calgary Stampeders
CFL's Most Outstanding Canadian Award – Dave Sapunjis (SB), Calgary Stampeders
CFL's Most Outstanding Defensive Player Award – Jearld Baylis (DT), Saskatchewan Roughriders
CFL's Most Outstanding Offensive Lineman Award – Chris Walby (OT), Winnipeg Blue Bombers
CFL's Most Outstanding Rookie Award – Mike O'Shea (DT), Hamilton Tiger-Cats
CFLPA's Outstanding Community Service Award – Mike "Pinball" Clemons (RB), Toronto Argonauts
CFL's Coach of the Year – Wally Buono, Calgary Stampeders
Commissioner's Award - Reg Wheeler, Hamilton Wildcats, help build the Canadian Football Hall of Fame.

References 

CFL
Canadian Football League seasons